William J. Rechin (August 20, 1930 – May 21, 2011), better known as Bill Rechin, was an American cartoonist who created the comic strips Out of Bounds and Crock.

Born in Buffalo, New York, Rechin studied art at Buffalo's Albright Academy of Art, where he met his wife, Trish. He drew his first strip, Pluribus, in 1971. In 1975, Rechin, Don Wilder (1934–2008) and Brant Parker launched Crock, a strip depicting the French Foreign Legion. Wilder and Rechin began their Out of Bounds strip in 1986.

Rechin lived in Spotsylvania County, Virginia with his wife. The couple had seven children and eight grandchildren. He died of esophageal cancer on May 21, 2011.

Awards
He received the National Cartoonists Society's Newspaper Panel Cartoon Award for 1992 for his work on Out of Bounds. He was president of the NCS for part of 1988. His son, cartoon illustrator Kevin Rechin, received the National Cartoonist Society Magazine and Book Illustration for 1999, and was nominated for the same award for 1997. Kevin Rechin took over Crock in May 2011, with his brother-in-law, Bob Morgan, scripting.

References

Sources

External links
 National Cartoonists Society biography
 Toonopedia: Crock

1930 births
2011 deaths
American comics artists
Artists from Buffalo, New York
Deaths from esophageal cancer
American comic strip cartoonists